Admiral Sir William King-Hall,  (11 March 1816 – 29 July 1886) was a Royal Navy officer who served as Commander-in-Chief, The Nore from 1877 to 1879.

Naval career
King-Hall joined the Royal Navy in 1829, and took part in operations off the coast of Syria in 1840. Promoted to Captain in 1853 he commanded  during the bombardment and capture of Fort Bomarsund and then commanded  during the attack on the Fortress of Sveaborg near Helsinki during the Crimean War.

King-Hall also commanded  during the Second Opium War and took part in the first attack on Canton in late 1856 and then the assault on the Taku Forts in 1858.

King-Hall was appointed Superintendent of Sheerness dockyard in 1865, Superintendent of Devonport dockyard in 1871 and Commander-in-Chief, The Nore in 1877 before retiring in 1881.

Family
In 1848 King-Hall married Louisa Forman and in 1880 he married Charlotte Tillotson (née Simpson): they had two sons (Admiral Sir Sir George King-Hall and Admiral Sir Herbert King-Hall) and one daughter.

There is a tablet in his memory at St Annes Church in Sutton Bonnington, Nottinghamshire.

See also

References

1816 births
1886 deaths
Knights Commander of the Order of the Bath
Royal Navy admirals
Royal Navy personnel of the Crimean War
Royal Navy personnel of the Second Opium War